Japan sent 42 competitors to compete in all five disciplines at the 2010 Winter Paralympics in Vancouver.

Medalists

Alpine skiing 

  Akira Kano Men's Super-G, sitting
  Taiki Morii Men's Downhill, sitting
  Taiki Morii Men's Super-G, sitting
  Akira Kano Men's Downhill, sitting
  Takeshi Suzuki Men's Giant Slalom, sitting
  Kuniko Obinata Women's Giant Slalom, sitting
  Kuniko Obinata Women's Slalom, sitting

Biathlon

Cross-country skiing 

  Yoshihiro Nitta Men's 1 km Sprint, standing
  Yoshihiro Nitta Men's 10 km Sprint, standing
  Shoko Ota Women's 1 km Sprint, standing

Ice sledge hockey 

Japan competed in ice sledge hockey. They finished the qualification rounds with a score of 2-1, and qualified for the semi-finals, where they defeated team Canada advancing to the finals where they faced Team America. In the finals they lost, scoring no goals winning a silver medal.

Wheelchair curling 

Japan competed in wheelchair curling.

See also
Japan at the 2010 Winter Olympics
Japan at the Paralympics

References

External links
Vancouver 2010 Paralympic Games official website
International Paralympic Committee official website

Nations at the 2010 Winter Paralympics
2010
Paralympics